Budi Sudarsono (born 19 September 1979 in Kediri, East Java) is a retired Indonesian footballer and currently work as football coach. He normally plays either as an attacking midfielder or a forward.

He played for Persik Kediri in the 2007 AFC Champions League group stage, where he scored two goals.

International career
He has made several appearances for the Indonesia national football team, and is best remembered for scoring goals in two consecutive Asian Cup tournaments. He opened his account by scoring a goal in the 2004 Asian Cup for Indonesia against Qatar in a group A game which Indonesia ended up winning 2–1. It was Indonesia's first ever victory in Asian Cup history since their first participation in Asian Cup 1996. His fans have nicknamed him Budi Gol, Budi Jancok, Kileng, Budi Drogba (for his resemblance to the Ivorian striker Didier Drogba), and Ular Piton (Python). He scored the only goal for Indonesia against Syria during the 2010 FIFA World Cup qualification in Jakarta in which Indonesia went on to lose 1–4 and lose the 2nd leg 0–7 and eliminated from the competition. Recently in December 2008, he scored hattrick and led Indonesia win 4–0 against Cambodia in AFF Suzuki Cup. He also scored a goal in the 2011 AFC Asian Cup qualification against Kuwait in Jakarta which ended with the score 1–1.

International appearances 

|}

Family 
Budi Sudarsono is the eldest child of six in his family. His father is Saifulloh and his mother is Murwani.

Participation in national team 
Pre-World Cup Qualifying 2001
SEA Games 2001
Tiger Cup 2002
Asian Cup 2004
AFF Cup 2006
Asian Cup 2007
Independence Cup
Grand Royal Challenge Cup 2008 Myanmar
AFF Suzuki Cup 2008

Honours

Club honours
Persija Jakarta
Liga Indonesia (1): 2001

Persik Kediri
Liga Indonesia (1): 2006

Sriwijaya
Copa Indonesia (1): 2008–09
Indonesian Community Shield (1): 2010

Country honours
Indonesia
Indonesian Independence Cup (1): 2008

References

1979 births
Living people
People from Kediri (city)
Sportspeople from East Java
Javanese people
Indonesian footballers
2004 AFC Asian Cup players
2007 AFC Asian Cup players
Expatriate footballers in Malaysia
Indonesian expatriate sportspeople in Malaysia
Malaysia Super League players
Persebaya Surabaya players
Persija Jakarta players
Deltras F.C. players
PDRM FA players
Sriwijaya F.C. players
Persikabo Bogor players
Persib Bandung players
Persik Kediri players
Liga 1 (Indonesia) players
Indonesian Premier Division players
Indonesian expatriate footballers
Indonesia international footballers
Association football forwards